Kraumur Awards is a music prize, organized by the Kraumur Music Fund, awarded for the best albums being released in Iceland.

The nominations for the first Kraumur Awards were announced in November 2008. Nominations and the award-winning albums are chosen by a selected panel of Icelandic music journalist and radio show hosts, with years of experience in playing and writing about Icelandic music.

The Kraumur Award usually goes to six albums, while 20 albums are nominated. The panel can add albums to the award category, which led to six albums in the first year and seven albums receiving the Kraumur award in 2013.

The Kraumur Awards an annual event with six best albums presented in alphabetical order.

Kraumur Awards 2008 

The 2008 Kraumur Awards went to:
 Agent Fresco for Lightbulb Universe
 FM Belfast for How to Make Friends
 Hugi Guðmundsson for Apocrypha
 Ísafold for All Sounds to Silence Come
 Mammút for Karkari
 Retro Stefson for Montaña

Nominations (20 albums):
 Agent Fresco - Lightbulb Universe
 Celestine - At the Borders of Arcadia
 Dísa - Dísa
 Dr. Spock - Falcon Christ
 Emilíana Torrini - Me and Armini
 FM Belfast - How to Make Friends
 Hugi Guðmundsson - Apocrypha
 Introbeats - Tívólí chillout
 Ísafold - All Sounds to Silence Come
 Klive - Sweaty Psalms
 Lay Low - Farewell Good Night’s Sleep
 Mammút - Karkari
 Morðingjarnir - Áfram Ísland
 Múgsefjun - Skiptar skoðanir
 Ólafur Arnalds - Variations of Static
 Retro Stefson - Montaña
 Reykjavík! - The Blood
 Sigur Rós - Með suð í eyrum við spilum endalaust
 Sin Fang Bous - Clangour
 Skakkamanage - All Over the Face

Kraumur Awards 2009 

The 2009 Kraumur Awards went to:
 Anna Guðný Guðmundsdóttir for Vingt regards sur l’enfant-Jésus
 Bloodgroup for Dry Land
 Helgi Hrafn Jónsson for For the Rest of my Childhood
 Hildur Guðnadóttir for Without Sinking
 Hjaltalin for Terminal
 Morðingjarnir for Flóttinn mikli

Nominations (20 albums):
 Anna Guðný Guðmundsdóttir - Vingt regards sur l’enfant-Jésus
 Árni Heiðar Karlsson  - Mæri
 Bloodgroup - Dry Land
 Bróðir Svartúlfs - Bróðir Svartúlfs EP
 Dikta - Get it together
 Egill Sæbjörnsson - Egill S
 Feldberg - Don’t Be A Stranger
 Helga Rós Indriðadóttir og Guðrún Dalía - Jórunn Viðar, Sönglög
 Helgi Hrafn Jónsson - For the Rest of my Childhood
 Hildur Guðnadóttir - Without Sinking
 Hjaltalin - Terminal
 Kimono - Easy Music for Difficult People
 Lights on the highway - Amanita Muscaria
 Morðingjarnir - Flóttinn mikli
 múm - Singa Along to Songs that You Don’t Know
 Pascal Pinon - Pascal Pinon
 Ruxpin - Where Do We Float From Here
 Sudden Weather Change - Stop! Handgrenade In The Name Of Crib Death’understand?
 The Deathmetal Supersquad - Dead Zeppelin
 Víkingur Heiðar - Debut

Kraumur Awards 2010 

The 2010 Kraumur Awards went to:

 Apparat Organ Quartet - Pólyfónía
 Daníel Bjarnason - Processions
 Ég - Lúxus upplifun
 Jónas Sigurðsson - Allt er eitthvað
 Nolo - No-Lo-Fi
 Ólöf Arnalds - Innundir skinni

Nominations (20 albums):
 Agent Fresco - A Long Time Listening
 Amiina - Puzzle
 Apparat Organ Quartet - Pólyfónía
 Daníel Bjarnason - Processions
 Ég - Lúxus upplifun
 Jónas Sigurðsson - Allt er eitthvað
 Kammerkór Suðurlands - Iepo Oneipo
 Miri - Okkar
 Momentum - Fixation, At Rest
 Moses Hightower - Búum til börn
 Nolo - No-Lo-Fi
 Ólöf Arnalds - Innundir skinni
 Prinspóló - Jukk
 Retro Stefson - Kimbabwe
 Samúel Jón Samúelsson Big Band - Helvítis Fokking Funk
 Seabear - We Built a Fire
 Sóley - Theater Island
 Stafrænn Hákon - Sanitas
 Valdimar - Undraland
 Quadruplos - Quadroplos

Kraumur Awards 2011 

The 2011 Kraumur Awards went to:

 ADHD - ADHD2
 Lay Low - Brostinn Strengur
 Reykjavík! - Locust Sounds
 Samaris - Hljóma Þú (ep)
 Sin Fang - Summer Echoes
 Sóley - We Sink

Nominations (20 albums):
 ADHD - ADHD2
 Anna Þorvalds - Rhízoma
 Ben Frost og Daníel Bjarnason - SÓLARIS
 Dead Skeletons - Dead Magick
 FM Belfast - Don’t want to sleep
 For a Minor Reflection - EP
 Helgi Hrafn Jónsson - Big Spring
 Hljómsveitin Ég - Ímynd Fíflsins
 Lay Low - Brostinn Strengur
 Nolo - Nology
 Of Monsters and Men - My Head is an Animal
 Ofvitarnir - Stephen Hawking/Steven Tyler
 Ragga Gröndal - Astrocat Lullaby
 Reykjavík! - Locust Sounds
 Samaris - Hljóma Þú (ep)
 Sin Fang - Summer Echoes
 Skurken - Gilsbakki
 Snorri Helga - Winter Sun
 Sóley - We Sink
 Sólstafir - Svartir Sandar

Kraumur Awards 2012 

The 2012 Kraumur Awards went to:

 Ásgeir Trausti - Dýrð í dauðaþögn 
 Hjaltalín - Enter 4
 Moses Hightower - Önnur Mósebók 
 Ojba Rasta - Ojba Rasta
 Pétur Ben - God’s Lonely Man 
 Retro Stefson – Retro Stefson

Nominations (20 albums):
 adhd - adhd4
 Ásgeir Trausti - Dýrð í dauðaþögn
 Borko - Born To Be Free
 Davíð Þór Jónsson - Improvised Piano Works 1
 Duo Harpverk - Greenhouse Sessions
 Futuregrapher - LP
 Ghostigital - Division of Culture & Tourism
 Hilmar Örn Hilmarsson & Steindór Andersen - Stafnbúi
 Hjaltalín - Enter 4
 Moses Hightower - Önnur Mósebók
 Muck - Slaves
 Nóra - Himinbrim
 Ojba Rasta - Ojba Rasta
 Pascal Pinon - Twosomeness
 Pétur Ben - God's Lonely Man
 Retro Stefson – Retro Stefson 
 Sin Fang - Half Dreams EP
 The Heavy Experience - Slowscope
 Tilbury - Exorcise
 Þórir Georg - I Will Die and You Will Die and it Will be Alright

Kraumur Awards 2013 

The 2013 Kraumur Awards went to:

 Cell7 – Cellf
 Dj. flugvél og geimskip - Glamúr í geimnum
 Grísalappalísa - Ali
 Gunnar Andreas Kristinsson – Patterns
 Just Another Snake Cult - Cupid Makes A Fool of Me
 Mammút - Komdu til mín svarta systir
 Sin Fang - Flowers

Nominations (20 albums):
 Benni Hemm Hemm - Eliminate Evil, Revive Good Times
 Cell7 – Cellf
 Daníel Bjarnason - Over Light Earth
 Dj. flugvél og geimskip - Glamúr í geimnum
 Futuregrapher, Gallery Six & Veronique – Crystal Lagoon (EP)
 Grísalappalísa - Ali
 Gunnar Andreas Kristinsson - Patterns
 Jóhann Kristinsson - Headphones
 Just Another Snake Cult - Cupid Makes A Fool of Me
 Lay Low - Talking About The Weather
 Mammút - Komdu til mín svarta systir
 Múm - Smilewound
 Per:Segulsvið - Tónlist fyrir Hana
 Ruxpin - This Time We Go Together
 Samúel J. Samúelsson Big Band - 4 hliðar
 Sin Fang - Flowers
 Strigaskór nr. 42 - Armadillo
 Tilbury - Northern Comfort
 Úlfur - White Mountain
 Þórir Georg - Ælulykt

The panel 

The panel selecting the Kraumur Awards nominees and award albums for the years 2008-2010: 
 Árni Matthíasson - head of panel, journalist with Morgunblaðið
 Alexandra Kjeld - journalist with Rjominn.is/Morgunblaðið
 Andrea Jónsdóttir - radio show host at Iceland National Radio 2
 Arnar Eggert Thoroddsen - journalist with Morgunblaðið
 Halldór Laxness (Dóri DNA) - journalist with DV
 Hildur Maral Hamíðsdóttir - journalist with Rjominn.is
 Ólafur Páll Gunnarsson - radio show host at Iceland National Radio 2
 Trausti Júlíusson - journalist with Fréttablaðið
 Þorkell Máni Pétursson - radio show host at Radio X
 Ragnheiður Eiríksdóttir - journalist with Fréttablaðið
 Arndís Björk Ásgeirsdóttir - radio show host at Iceland National Radio 1
 Halla Steinunn Stefánsdóttir - radio show host at Iceland National Radio 1
 Matthías Már Magnússon - radio show host at Iceland National Radio 2

In the panel for 2008 Kraumur Awards only
 Sigvaldi Kaldalóns - radio show host at radio FM 957
 Sveinn Birkir Björnsson journalist with Reykjavik Grapevine

In the panel for 2009 Kraumur Awards only
 Haukur S. Magnússon - editor of Reykjavik Grapevine
 Skarphéðinn Guðmundsson - 365 media
 Benedikt Reynisson - Benson is Fantastic music blog

In the panel for 2011 Kraumur Awards:
 Alexandra Kjeld - music journalist
 Andrea Jónsdóttir - radio show host at Iceland National Radio 2
 Anna Andersen - editor of Reykjavik Grapevine
 Arnar Eggert Thoroddsen - journalist with Morgunblaðið
 Arndís Björk Ásgeirsdóttir -  radio show host at Iceland National Radio 1
 Árni Matthíasson - head of panel, journalist with Morgunblaðið
 Benedikt Reynisson - Benson is Fantastic music blog
 Berglind María Tómasdóttir - radio show host at Iceland National Radio 1
 Egill Harðarson - web designer / editor of Rjominn.is 
 Eldar Ástþórsson - marketing at CCP Games
 Elísabet Indra Ragnarsdóttir - radio show host at Iceland National Radio 1
 Helena Þrastardóttir - librarian / music lover
 Helga Vala Helgadóttir - lawyer at Valva / music lover
 Hildur Maral Hamíðsdóttir - journalist with Rjominn.is / PR and management 
 Höskuldur Daði Magnússon - journalist with Fréttablaðið 
 Kamilla Ingibergsdóttir - pr and marketing at Iceland Airwaves Music Festival
 Ólafur Páll Gunnarsson - program manager and host at Iceland National Radio 2
 Ómar Eyþórsson - radio show host at Radio X-ið 977
 Trausti Júlíusson - journalist with Fréttablaðið
 Þorkell Máni Pétursson - radio show host at Radio X-ið 977

In the panel for 2012 Kraumur Awards:
 Alexandra Kjeld - music journalist
 Andrea Jónsdóttir  - radio show host at Iceland National Radio 2
 Anna Andersen - editor of Reykjavik Grapevine
 Arnar Eggert Thoroddsen - journalist with Morgunblaðið and independent music writer
 Arndís Björk Ásgeirsdóttir - radio show host at Iceland National Radio 1
 Árni Matthíasson - head of panel, journalist with Morgunblaðið 
 Ása Dýradóttir - musician / Mammút
 Benedikt Reynisson - Benson is Fantastic music blog and music journalist for Kjarninn
 Egill Harðarson - web designer / editor of Rjominn.is 
 Elísabet Indra Ragnarsdóttir - radio show host at Iceland National Radio 1
 Guðni Tómasson- music lover, historian and chairman of the board of directors, The Iceland Symphony Orchestra 
 Haukur S. Magnússon - philosopher, musician and editor for Grapevine
 Helena Þrastardóttir, Helga Vala Helgadóttir
 Hildur Maral Hamíðsdóttir - journalist with [Rjo]minn.is / PR and management [Projecta]
 Höskuldur Daði Magnússon - journalist/editor with Fréttatíminn 
 Kamilla Ingibergsdóttir - pr and marketing at Iceland Airwaves Music Festival
 Ólafur Halldór Ólafsson Óli Dóri)- radio show host at Radio X-ið 977 and music blogger for [Straum.is] 
 Ólafur Páll Gunnarsson - program manager and host at Iceland National Radio 2
 Sólrún Sumarliðadóttir - musician / amiina
 Trausti Júlíusson - enthusiastic music specialist and journalist

In the panel for 2013 Kraumur Awards:
 Andrea Jónsdóttir - radio show host at Iceland National Radio 2
 Anna Andersen - editor of Reykjavik Grapevine
 Arnar Eggert Thoroddsen - journalist with Morgunblaðið and independent music writer
 Árni Matthíasson - head of panel, journalist with Morgunblaðið 
 Benedikt Reynisson - Benson is Fantastic music blog and music journalist for Kjarninn
 Bob Cluness - reporter for Grapevine and music blogger
 Egill Harðarson - web designer / editor of Rjominn.is 
 Elísabet Indra Ragnarsdóttir - radio show host at Iceland National Radio 1
 Guðni Tómasson - music lover, historian and chairman of the board of directors, The Iceland Symphony Orchestra 
 Haukur Viðar Alfreðsson - journalist for Fréttablaðið and punk-rocker, Morðingjarnir
 Helena Þrastardóttir - librarian / music lover
 Helga Vala Helgadóttir - lawyer at Valva / music lover
 Helga Þórey Jónsdóttir - enthusiastic music lover and film buff 
 Höskuldur Daði Magnússon - journalist/editor with Fréttatíminn 
 María Lilja Þrastardóttir - reporter 
 Ólafur Halldór Ólafsson (Óli Dóri)- radio show host at Radio X-ið 977 and music blogger for [Straum.is]
 Ragnheiður Eiríksdóttir - musician Hellvar, philosopher and radio host at Rás 2
 Trausti Júlíusson - enthusiastic music specialist and journalist 
 Valdís Thor - photographer and music lover
 Þórunn Edda Magnúsdóttir - shop manager for 12 Tónar Harpa

References

External links 

 Kraumur official site 
 Kraumur official site - English
 Trade Council of Iceland, Kraumur Award Winners 2008
 Iceland's Kraumur Awards 2008 Documentary - SPIN Magazine; SPIN Earth

European music awards
Icelandic awards